Vinpeius is a genus of skippers in the family Hesperiidae. It has one species Vinpeius tinga.

References

Natural History Museum Lepidoptera genus database

Hesperiinae
Monotypic butterfly genera
Hesperiidae genera